John R. Fellows (July 29, 1832 – December 7, 1896) was an American lawyer and politician from Arkansas and New York.  He served as New York County District Attorney (1888-1890, 1894-1896), and a member of Congress from New York (1891-1893).

Life
He was the son of Tisdale Eddy Fellows (1800–1874), farmer, and later Superintendent of the Halfmoon Cemetery, and Eliza (Harris) Fellows (1809–1867). The family moved to a farm in Stillwater (a part which is now in the city of Mechanicville. New York) in Saratoga County, New York, where he attended the country schools. Among his playmates was Elmer E. Ellsworth.

In 1850, Fellows went to Camden, Ouachita County, Arkansas, to live with his uncle. There he studied law and was admitted to the bar in 1855. At one time he practiced law in partnership with Walter L. Bragg.

He ran for presidential elector on the Constitutional Union ticket of Bell and Everett in 1860, but Arkansas was carried by John C. Breckinridge. He was a delegate to the State secession convention in 1861.

He enlisted in the 1st Arkansas Infantry of the Confederate States Army. After the Battle of Shiloh, he was made a colonel and assigned to staff duties as assistant adjutant to Gen. William Beall. Later he was inspector general at Port Hudson, Louisiana, and was captured there on July 9, 1863. He was kept a prisoner of war until the end of the American Civil War, and released on June 10, 1865. Afterwards he resumed the practice of law in Camden. He was a member of the Arkansas Senate from 1866 to 1867. On July 4, 1867, he married Lizzie Reynolds, and they had six children.

He was a delegate to the 1868 Democratic National Convention, held at the new Tammany Hall building in New York City, and was noticed by Tammany boss William M. Tweed as an eloquent campaign speaker. Urged by Tweed, Fellows removed to New York City to continue the practice of law there and to campaign for the Tammany organization.

Tweed secured Fellows's appointment in 1868 by Corporation Counsel Richard O'Gorman (1821–1895) as Assistant C.C., and in 1869, D.A. Samuel B. Garvin appointed Fellows an Assistant New York County District Attorney. He remained in this office until the end of 1872 when Garvin's term expired and a Republican D.A. succeeded. After the fall of Tweed, Fellows left Tammany and joined the Anti-Tammany Democrats in New York City, at times known as the "Young Democracy", the "County Democracy" and "Irving Hall".

Fellows was re-appointed Assistant D.A. in 1882 by D.A. John McKeon, and remained on this post under John Vincent, Wheeler H. Peckham, Peter B. Olney and Randolph B. Martine. Fellows was elected on the Tammany and County Democracy tickets D.A. in November 1887, defeating his fellow Assistant D.A. De Lancey Nicoll who was a Democrat but ran on the Republican ticket. During the fiercely fought election campaign, two letters Fellows had written to Boss Tweed on February 1, 1873, asking for a loan of $523, were published in The New York Times, with the comment that this was the payment for Fellows's service in having the jury disagree on a verdict against Tweed on the previous day, and that the "loan" was never paid back. Fellows was D.A. from 1888 to 1890, but did not run for re-election in November 1890, preferring to rejoin Tammany Hall and to run for Congress instead. Nicoll was then elected on the Tammany ticket to succeed as D.A.

Fellows was elected as a Democrat to the 52nd and 53rd United States Congresses, serving from March 4, 1891, until his resignation, effective December 31, 1893.

He was again elected on the Tammany ticket New York County D.A., and took office on January 1, 1894. He had been a delegate to all Democratic National Conventions from 1868 on. He also was a delegate to the 1896 Democratic National Convention but repudiated William Jennings Bryan, the Democratic candidate nominated on a Free Silver platform and joined the "Gold Democrats". In September 1896, he was a delegate to the National Democratic Convention in Indianapolis which nominated the Palmer - Buckner ticket for the 1896 United States presidential election.

Fellows died on December 7, 1896, at his home at 610, West 152nd Street in New York City from stomach cancer; and was buried at the Trinity Church Cemetery.

Notes

Sources

Civil War info
Civil War Soldiers and Sailors System at the National Park Service
FAC SIMILES OF JOHN R. FELLOWS'S LETTERS TO TWEED in NYT on November 5, 1887
KEEP THEM BEFORE THE PEOPLE.; THE LETTERS JOHN R. FELLOWS WROTE TO WILLIAM M. TWEED in NYT on November 6, 1887
COL. JOHN R. FELLOWS DEAD in NYT on December 8, 1896
FUNERAL OF COL. FELLOWS in NYT on December 9, 1896
BURIAL OF COL. FELLOWS in NYT on December 10, 1896
Fellows genealogy

External links

1832 births
1896 deaths
New York County District Attorneys
People from Stillwater, New York
Politicians from Troy, New York
Confederate States Army officers
Arkansas lawyers
Arkansas state senators
People from Camden, Arkansas
Arkansas Constitutional Unionists
Northern-born Confederates
Deaths from stomach cancer
Deaths from cancer in New York (state)
Democratic Party members of the United States House of Representatives from New York (state)
People from Halfmoon, New York
Burials at Trinity Church Cemetery
19th-century American politicians
19th-century American lawyers